John Spencer Pingel (November 6, 1916 – August 14, 1999) was an American football back and punter.

Pingel played college football at the Michigan State University and was selected as a first-team All-American in 1938 and second-team in 1937.  He holds the all-time NCAA record for most punting yards in a season with 4,138 yards in 1938.  Pingel was a triple-threat man who also ranked among the NCAA leaders in rushing (7th with an average of 5.0 yards per rush) and passing (7th win an average of 6 completions per game) during the 1938 season. 

Pingel was selected by the Detroit Lions in the first round (7th overall pick) of the 1939 NFL Draft.  He signed with the Lions in May 1939 and played in nine games, eight as a starter for the 1939 Detroit Lions.  After retiring from football, he had a successful career in advertising, serving as the chief executive officer of the Ross Roy advertising agency.  He was elected to the College Football Hall of Fame in 1968.  Pingel died at age 82 in Palm Beach Gardens, Florida.

References

1916 births
1999 deaths
American football halfbacks
Detroit Lions players
Michigan State Spartans football players
College Football Hall of Fame inductees
People from Mount Clemens, Michigan
Players of American football from Michigan
Sportspeople from Metro Detroit